The Coldest Season is a 2007 album by dub techno duo Echospace (credited on the album as Deepchord Presents Echospace) which is composed of Rod Modell (Deepchord) and Stephen Hitchell.  The Coldest Season was recorded using old analog equipment.  The album is very atmospheric with ambient and techno influences. It was named the 49th best album of the decade by Resident Advisor.

Track listing

References

External links 
 

2007 albums